Mroczkowski (feminine: Mroczkowska; plural: Mroczkowscy) is a Polish surname. It is a toponymic surname derived from the place name Mroczków.

Notable people with this surname include:

 Anne Mroczkowski (born 1953), Canadian TV reporter
 Antoni Mroczkowski (1896–1970), Polish aviator
 Katarzyna Mroczkowska (born 1980), Polish volleyball player
 Megan Mroczkowski, M.D. (born 1981), American child forensic psychiatrist and Associate Professor of Psychiatry at Columbia University 
 Radosław Mroczkowski (born 1967), Polish football manager
 Walery Mroczkowski (1840–1889), Polish insurgent and photographer

See also
 
 
Mruczkowski (disambiguation)

References

Polish-language surnames
Polish toponymic surnames

pl:Mroczkowski